Mystus ankutta, also known as the Sri Lanka dwarf catfish or yellow dwarf catfish, is a species of catfish of the family Bagridae that is endemic to Sri Lanka. In the wild it is found in freshwater bodies from Kelani river to Nilwala river in Sri Lanka.

It grows to a length of 7.9 cm. This fish is classified as endangered by the IUCN.

References 

Bagridae
Catfish of Asia
Freshwater fish of Sri Lanka
Endemic fauna of Sri Lanka
Fish described in 2008
Taxa named by Rohan Pethiyagoda